John Bell (July 20, 1765March 22, 1836) was the 12th governor of New Hampshire from 1828 to 1829. Samuel Bell, a brother, was the eighth governor of New Hampshire from 1819 to 1823.

John Bell was born on July 20, 1765, in Londonderry in the Province of New Hampshire, the son of John and Mary Ann (née Gilmore) Bell. John Bell, Jr. (1730–1825) served in the New Hampshire Senate from 1786 to 1790 representing Rockingham County.

He received a limited education by several New Hampshire common schools, and became a merchant, attaining success by trading and selling New Hampshire products in Canada and Canadian products in New Hampshire.  He was later involved in other ventures, including farming and land speculation.  Initially a Federalist, according to the New Hampshire Division of Historical Records, he entered state politics when he became a member of the New Hampshire House of Representatives from Londonderry in 1799.  He later moved to Chester, and he married Persis Thom on December 25, 1803.  They had 10 children; the youngest, Charles Henry Bell, served as governor from 1881 to 1883.  From 1803 to 1804 Bell was a member of the New Hampshire State Senate, representing the 3rd District.  He was also a member of the Executive Council of New Hampshire from 1817 to 1823, as a Democratic-Republican and the sheriff of Rockingham County from 1823 to 1828.

In 1828 Bell was a National Republican and a supporter of President John Quincy Adams.  Adams lost to Andrew Jackson in that year's presidential election, but Bell defeated Jackson supporter Benjamin Pierce 21,149 to 18,672 votes in the election for governor.

While he was governor, the Exeter Savings Bank was chartered; several state manufacturing companies were incorporated; a number of schools were founded; and manufacturing within the state increased.  Bell also promoted state support for formal agricultural education, and experimentation in farming and agriculture.

In 1829, Bell was defeated for re-election by Benjamin Pierce.  He then retired from public service, and pursued actively his farming interests.  He died in Chester on March 22, 1836, and was buried in the Village Cemetery in Chester.

Footnotes

Sources

1765 births
1836 deaths
People from Londonderry, New Hampshire
American Presbyterians
New Hampshire National Republicans
Governors of New Hampshire
People from Chester, New Hampshire
National Republican Party state governors of the United States